Broad Daylight is an album of original material from Pittsburg, CA rapper The Jacka released on the Berkeley-based record label Town Records. The album consisted of 14 songs, and was released on January 12, 2009. It features different artists, like Keak da Sneak, Lee Majors, and Agerman.

Track listing 
 Intro
 We Mafia (feat. Yung Lott)
 Coulda Did Better  (feat. T-Wayne) 
 Have You No Fear (feat. Joe Blow)
 All In the Game (feat. B-Town Mac, Fleetwood Low & K-Dubb)
 The Block (feat. Lee Majors & B-Town Mac)
 Crazy Here (feat. Joe Blow)
 Ballervard (feat. Keak Da Sneak, Agerman & Extreme)
 Interlude
 Fly High (feat. Shady Nate, B-Town Mac & Pimp Tone)
 Ham Sammich (feat. Joe Blow & T-Wayne)
 Try to Let Go (feat. Kafani, Netta B & B-Town Mac)
 Don't Wanna Hear About It (feat. Chino Ning, B-Town Mac & D-Dosia)
 Outro

Personnel 

 Executive Producer - B-Town MAC
 Producer - D-Dosia (tracks: 5, 6, 10, 13), One Drop Scott (tracks: 12)

References 

2010 albums
Albums produced by Cozmo
The Jacka albums